Yeo-Neun is the eighth studio album by South Korean artist Okkyung Lee. It was released on May 8, 2020, by Shelter Press.

Critical reception

Yeo-Neun was met with widespread acclaim reviews from critics. Tom Piekarski of Exclaim! reviewed it is "bound to stand as one of this year's best neoclassical releases." Malvika Padin of The Line of Best Fit described Yeo-Neun as "Beacon of contemporary experimental music". Jonathan Williger of Pitchfork said "She is an exceptionally expressive performer, able to conjure rapture as effectively as unrest."

Track listing
All tracks written by Okkyung Lee.

Personnel
Credits adapted from the liner notes of Yeo-Neun.

Musicians 
 Maeve Gilchrist – harp
 Okkyung Lee – cello
 Eivind Opsvik – bass
 Jacob Sacks – piano

References

2020 albums
Okkyung Lee albums